Jailu Pakshi() is a 1986 Indian Telugu-language film directed by Kodi Ramakrishna , produced  by S. Sashi Bhushan in the banner of Sri Sarathi Studios. The film has musical score by K. V. Mahadevan. It was released on 13 December 1986 to positive reviews and emerged as a commercial success.
The  film was remade in Tamil with Vijayakanth as Sirai Paravai.

Cast
 Sobhan Babu  as Inspector Rana Prathap
 Radhika Sarathkumar  as Durga
 Sumalatha 
 Rao Gopala Rao  as Chakrapani
 Nutan Prasad as Sambaiah
 Sutti Velu as Rangaiah
Allu Ramalingaiah as Ganda Bherundam
Nirmalamma as Rana Prathap's mother
Baby Shalini as Bhavani
Sakshi Ranga Rao as Tulasi Ram
Jaya Malini
Anuradha
Vankayla Satyanarayana as Judge
P.J. Sarma as Public Prosecutor

Soundtrack 
Soundtrack composed by K. V. Mahadevan was released through AVM Audio music label. Lyrics were written by C. Narayana Reddy and Sirivennela Seetharama Sastry.

Reception

References

External links

1980s Telugu-language films
Telugu films remade in other languages